Ecological District is a station on the Red line of Kaohsiung MRT in Zuoying District, Kaohsiung, Taiwan.

The station is a two-level, underground station with an island platform and two exits. It is 188-metres long and is located at the intersection of Bo-ai 3rd Rd. and Mengzih Rd., near Bo-ai Park.

Around the Station
 Kaohsiung Veterans General Hospital
 Zhouzai Wetland Park
 Bo-ai Park (Botanical Garden)
 Singuang Elementary School

References

External links
KRTC Ecological District Station

2008 establishments in Taiwan
Kaohsiung Metro Red line stations
Railway stations opened in 2008